Football 7-a-side at the 2001 CPISRA World Games was held in Nottingham at the Harvey Hadden Stadium from 19 July to 29 July. Football 7-a-side is played by athletes with cerebral palsy, a condition characterized by impairment of muscular coordination, stroke, or traumatic brain injury (TBI).

Football 7-a-side was played with modified FIFA rules. Among the modifications were that there were seven players, no offside, a smaller playing field, and permission for one-handed throw-ins. Matches consisted of two thirty-minute halves, with a fifteen-minute half-time break.

Participating teams and officials

Qualifying
The following teams are qualified for the tournament:

Venues
The venues to be used for the World Championships were located in Nottingham.

Format

The first round, the first group stage, was a competition between the 13 teams divided among the groups of three and one group of four, where each group engaged in a round-robin tournament within itself. The two highest ranked teams in each group advanced to the second group stage for the position one to eight. the last team(s) plays for the positions nine to 13. Teams were awarded three points for a win and one for a draw. When comparing teams in a group over-all result came before head-to-head.

In the second round, the second group stage, the two groups, each with four teams, fighting for the positions one to eight, the first placed of the two groups played in the finals around the victory of the tournament, the second place around the third place, the third place around the fifth place and the last plays around the seventh place. The five last placed, one from group 1, group 3 and group 4 and two from group 2 plays everyone against everyone. The first placed is the ninth of the tournament, the second-place finishes the tenth, the third-place finishes the eleventh, the fourth place the twelfth and the fifth place the thirteenth. For any match in the finals, a draw after 60 minutes of regulation time was followed by two 10 minute periods of extra time to determine a winner. If the teams were still tied, a penalty shoot-out was held to determine a winner.

Classification
Athletes with a physical disability competed. The athlete's disability was caused by a non-progressive brain damage that affects motor control, such as cerebral palsy, traumatic brain injury or stroke. Athletes must be ambulant.

Players were classified by level of disability.
C5: Athletes with difficulties when walking and running, but not in standing or when kicking the ball.
C6: Athletes with control and co-ordination problems of their upper limbs, especially when running.
C7: Athletes with hemiplegia.
C8: Athletes with minimal disability; must meet eligibility criteria and have an impairment that has impact on the sport of football.

Teams must field at least one class C5 or C6 player at all times. No more than two players of class C8 are permitted to play at the same time.

First group stage
The first group stage have seen the 13 teams divided into four groups of four teams.

Group 1

Group 2

Group 3

Group 4

Second group stage
The second group stage have seen the 13 teams divided into four groups of four teams.

Group 5

Group 6

Group 7

Finals
Position 7-8

Position 5-6

Position 3-4

Final

Statistics

Ranking

See also

References

External links
Official website from February 14, 2002
Cerebral Palsy International Sports & Recreation Association (CPISRA)
International Federation of Cerebral Palsy Football (IFCPF)

2001 in association football
2001
Paralympic association football
Football at the Cerebral Palsy Games
CP football